The 1964 VFL season was the 68th season of the Victorian Football League (VFL), the highest level senior Australian rules football competition in Victoria. The season featured twelve clubs, ran from 18 April until 19 September, and comprised an 18-game home-and-away season followed by a finals series featuring the top four clubs.

The premiership was won by the Melbourne Football Club for the twelfth time, after it defeated  by four points in the 1964 VFL Grand Final.

Premiership season
In 1964, the VFL competition consisted of twelve teams of 18 on-the-field players each, plus two substitute players, known as the 19th man and the 20th man. A player could be substituted for any reason; however, once substituted, a player could not return to the field of play under any circumstances.

Teams played each other in a home-and-away season of 18 rounds; matches 12 to 18 were the "home-and-way reverse" of matches 1 to 7.

Once the 18 round home-and-away season had finished, the 1964 VFL Premiers were determined by the specific format and conventions of the Page–McIntyre system.

Round 1

|- bgcolor="#CCCCFF"
| Home team
| Home team score
| Away team
| Away team score
| Venue
| Crowd
| Date
|- bgcolor="#FFFFFF"
| 
| 8.16 (64)
| 
| 5.4 (34)
| Western Oval
| 23,965
| 18 April 1964
|- bgcolor="#FFFFFF"
| 
| 12.13 (85)
| 
| 11.13 (79)
| Windy Hill
| 29,500
| 18 April 1964
|- bgcolor="#FFFFFF"
| 
| 14.15 (99)
| 
| 10.11 (71)
| Victoria Park
| 29,255
| 18 April 1964
|- bgcolor="#FFFFFF"
| 
| 10.16 (76)
| 
| 10.8 (68)
| Princes Park
| 23,053
| 18 April 1964
|- bgcolor="#FFFFFF"
| 
| 10.13 (73)
| 
| 14.13 (97)
| Lake Oval
| 20,260
| 18 April 1964
|- bgcolor="#FFFFFF"
| 
| 14.13 (97)
| 
| 17.8 (110)
| MCG
| 66,250
| 18 April 1964

Round 2

|- bgcolor="#CCCCFF"
| Home team
| Home team score
| Away team
| Away team score
| Venue
| Crowd
| Date
|- bgcolor="#FFFFFF"
| 
| 13.17 (95)
| 
| 18.10 (118)
| Brunswick Street Oval
| 17,603
| 25 April 1964
|- bgcolor="#FFFFFF"
| 
| 8.13 (61)
| 
| 11.11 (77)
| Arden Street Oval
| 15,914
| 25 April 1964
|- bgcolor="#FFFFFF"
| 
| 13.18 (96)
| 
| 6.7 (43)
| Junction Oval
| 33,600
| 25 April 1964
|- bgcolor="#FFFFFF"
| 
| 11.9 (75)
| 
| 15.21 (111)
| Punt Road Oval
| 27,300
| 25 April 1964
|- bgcolor="#FFFFFF"
| 
| 14.11 (95)
| 
| 6.7 (43)
| Kardinia Park
| 40,290
| 25 April 1964
|- bgcolor="#FFFFFF"
| 
| 9.20 (74)
| 
| 8.5 (53)
| Glenferrie Oval
| 28,000
| 25 April 1964

Round 3

|- bgcolor="#CCCCFF"
| Home team
| Home team score
| Away team
| Away team score
| Venue
| Crowd
| Date
|- bgcolor="#FFFFFF"
| 
| 12.15 (87)
| 
| 9.11 (65)
| Glenferrie Oval
| 25,000
| 2 May 1964
|- bgcolor="#FFFFFF"
| 
| 6.12 (48)
| 
| 11.24 (90)
| Brunswick Street Oval
| 15,723
| 2 May 1964
|- bgcolor="#FFFFFF"
| 
| 16.11 (107)
| 
| 19.7 (121)
| Windy Hill
| 21,000
| 2 May 1964
|- bgcolor="#FFFFFF"
| 
| 8.7 (55)
| 
| 8.15 (63)
| Lake Oval
| 18,920
| 2 May 1964
|- bgcolor="#FFFFFF"
| 
| 8.12 (60)
| 
| 11.13 (79)
| Western Oval
| 23,983
| 2 May 1964
|- bgcolor="#FFFFFF"
| 
| 11.13 (79)
| 
| 4.9 (33)
| MCG
| 45,494
| 2 May 1964

Round 4

|- bgcolor="#CCCCFF"
| Home team
| Home team score
| Away team
| Away team score
| Venue
| Crowd
| Date
|- bgcolor="#FFFFFF"
| 
| 12.13 (85)
| 
| 8.9 (57)
| Victoria Park
| 29,237
| 9 May 1964
|- bgcolor="#FFFFFF"
| 
| 12.8 (80)
| 
| 16.15 (111)
| Princes Park
| 21,663
| 9 May 1964
|- bgcolor="#FFFFFF"
| 
| 13.15 (93)
| 
| 9.13 (67)
| Junction Oval
| 35,300
| 9 May 1964
|- bgcolor="#FFFFFF"
| 
| 14.15 (99)
| 
| 9.14 (68)
| Arden Street Oval
| 17,431
| 9 May 1964
|- bgcolor="#FFFFFF"
| 
| 14.20 (104)
| 
| 5.10 (40)
| Punt Road Oval
| 17,200
| 9 May 1964
|- bgcolor="#FFFFFF"
| 
| 8.21 (69)
| 
| 14.7 (91)
| Kardinia Park
| 34,083
| 9 May 1964

Round 5

|- bgcolor="#CCCCFF"
| Home team
| Home team score
| Away team
| Away team score
| Venue
| Crowd
| Date
|- bgcolor="#FFFFFF"
| 
| 10.14 (74)
| 
| 8.19 (67)
| Punt Road Oval
| 27,270
| 16 May 1964
|- bgcolor="#FFFFFF"
| 
| 7.11 (53)
| 
| 10.25 (85)
| Windy Hill
| 27,000
| 16 May 1964
|- bgcolor="#FFFFFF"
| 
| 8.11 (59)
| 
| 11.10 (76)
| Lake Oval
| 24,580
| 16 May 1964
|- bgcolor="#FFFFFF"
| 
| 15.13 (103)
| 
| 7.14 (56)
| Arden Street Oval
| 20,862
| 16 May 1964
|- bgcolor="#FFFFFF"
| 
| 16.18 (114)
| 
| 8.19 (67)
| Glenferrie Oval
| 13,100
| 16 May 1964
|- bgcolor="#FFFFFF"
| 
| 12.13 (85)
| 
| 9.12 (66)
| Victoria Park
| 32,868
| 16 May 1964

Round 6

|- bgcolor="#CCCCFF"
| Home team
| Home team score
| Away team
| Away team score
| Venue
| Crowd
| Date
|- bgcolor="#FFFFFF"
| 
| 11.6 (72)
| 
| 8.11 (59)
| Kardinia Park
| 25,264
| 23 May 1964
|- bgcolor="#FFFFFF"
| 
| 10.22 (82)
| 
| 10.9 (69)
| Western Oval
| 16,437
| 23 May 1964
|- bgcolor="#FFFFFF"
| 
| 10.18 (78)
| 
| 13.17 (95)
| Brunswick Street Oval
| 15,043
| 23 May 1964
|- bgcolor="#FFFFFF"
| 
| 10.13 (73)
| 
| 10.8 (68)
| MCG
| 53,795
| 23 May 1964
|- bgcolor="#FFFFFF"
| 
| 9.19 (73)
| 
| 11.3 (69)
| Windy Hill
| 30,300
| 23 May 1964
|- bgcolor="#FFFFFF"
| 
| 13.19 (97)
| 
| 6.13 (49)
| Junction Oval
| 25,300
| 23 May 1964

Round 7

|- bgcolor="#CCCCFF"
| Home team
| Home team score
| Away team
| Away team score
| Venue
| Crowd
| Date
|- bgcolor="#FFFFFF"
| 
| 13.11 (89)
| 
| 7.16 (58)
| Glenferrie Oval
| 22,000
| 30 May 1964
|- bgcolor="#FFFFFF"
| 
| 11.23 (89)
| 
| 13.8 (86)
| Kardinia Park
| 28,000
| 30 May 1964
|- bgcolor="#FFFFFF"
| 
| 22.18 (150)
| 
| 6.6 (42)
| Victoria Park
| 34,222
| 30 May 1964
|- bgcolor="#FFFFFF"
| 
| 8.12 (60)
| 
| 8.11 (59)
| Princes Park
| 18,945
| 30 May 1964
|- bgcolor="#FFFFFF"
| 
| 12.14 (86)
| 
| 6.8 (44)
| MCG
| 33,129
| 30 May 1964
|- bgcolor="#FFFFFF"
| 
| 11.18 (84)
| 
| 14.12 (96)
| Lake Oval
| 20,470
| 30 May 1964

Round 8

|- bgcolor="#CCCCFF"
| Home team
| Home team score
| Away team
| Away team score
| Venue
| Crowd
| Date
|- bgcolor="#FFFFFF"
| 
| 10.9 (69)
| 
| 11.17 (83)
| Arden Street Oval
| 19,620
| 6 June 1964
|- bgcolor="#FFFFFF"
| 
| 5.5 (35)
| 
| 6.12 (48)
| Western Oval
| 20,000
| 6 June 1964
|- bgcolor="#FFFFFF"
| 
| 7.9 (51)
| 
| 17.16 (118)
| Brunswick Street Oval
| 12,727
| 6 June 1964
|- bgcolor="#FFFFFF"
| 
| 9.8 (62)
| 
| 6.12 (48)
| Glenferrie Oval
| 26,000
| 6 June 1964
|- bgcolor="#FFFFFF"
| 
| 3.12 (30)
| 
| 7.13 (55)
| Punt Road Oval
| 34,600
| 6 June 1964
|- bgcolor="#FFFFFF"
| 
| 8.13 (61)
| 
| 12.14 (86)
| Lake Oval
| 18,700
| 6 June 1964

Round 9

|- bgcolor="#CCCCFF"
| Home team
| Home team score
| Away team
| Away team score
| Venue
| Crowd
| Date
|- bgcolor="#FFFFFF"
| 
| 13.10 (88)
| 
| 10.13 (73)
| Windy Hill
| 22,000
| 13 June 1964
|- bgcolor="#FFFFFF"
| 
| 11.15 (81)
| 
| 11.12 (78)
| Princes Park
| 24,930
| 13 June 1964
|- bgcolor="#FFFFFF"
| 
| 13.18 (96)
| 
| 6.12 (48)
| Junction Oval
| 20,900
| 13 June 1964
|- bgcolor="#FFFFFF"
| 
| 10.15 (75)
| 
| 7.9 (51)
| Arden Street Oval
| 11,763
| 15 June 1964
|- bgcolor="#FFFFFF"
| 
| 10.15 (75)
| 
| 3.8 (26)
| Kardinia Park
| 39,911
| 15 June 1964
|- bgcolor="#FFFFFF"
| 
| 10.13 (73)
| 
| 8.15 (63)
| MCG
| 86,664
| 15 June 1964

Round 10

|- bgcolor="#CCCCFF"
| Home team
| Home team score
| Away team
| Away team score
| Venue
| Crowd
| Date
|- bgcolor="#FFFFFF"
| 
| 18.15 (123)
| 
| 10.8 (68)
| Junction Oval
| 20,300
| 27 June 1964
|- bgcolor="#FFFFFF"
| 
| 23.18 (156)
| 
| 6.7 (43)
| MCG
| 27,614
| 27 June 1964
|- bgcolor="#FFFFFF"
| 
| 11.8 (74)
| 
| 10.12 (72)
| Kardinia Park
| 20,579
| 27 June 1964
|- bgcolor="#FFFFFF"
| 
| 13.11 (89)
| 
| 15.8 (98)
| Victoria Park
| 31,133
| 27 June 1964
|- bgcolor="#FFFFFF"
| 
| 14.9 (93)
| 
| 13.7 (85)
| Western Oval
| 13,119
| 27 June 1964
|- bgcolor="#FFFFFF"
| 
| 10.9 (69)
| 
| 8.15 (63)
| Windy Hill
| 22,000
| 27 June 1964

Round 11

|- bgcolor="#CCCCFF"
| Home team
| Home team score
| Away team
| Away team score
| Venue
| Crowd
| Date
|- bgcolor="#FFFFFF"
| 
| 12.11 (83)
| 
| 10.9 (69)
| Victoria Park
| 27,588
| 4 July 1964
|- bgcolor="#FFFFFF"
| 
| 7.19 (61)
| 
| 13.7 (85)
| Princes Park
| 22,293
| 4 July 1964
|- bgcolor="#FFFFFF"
| 
| 6.12 (48)
| 
| 10.5 (65)
| Punt Road Oval
| 10,170
| 4 July 1964
|- bgcolor="#FFFFFF"
| 
| 12.11 (83)
| 
| 18.21 (129)
| Lake Oval
| 10,490
| 4 July 1964
|- bgcolor="#FFFFFF"
| 
| 12.9 (81)
| 
| 3.3 (21)
| Glenferrie Oval
| 13,000
| 4 July 1964
|- bgcolor="#FFFFFF"
| 
| 7.8 (50)
| 
| 10.9 (69)
| Brunswick Street Oval
| 11,254
| 4 July 1964

Round 12

|- bgcolor="#CCCCFF"
| Home team
| Home team score
| Away team
| Away team score
| Venue
| Crowd
| Date
|- bgcolor="#FFFFFF"
| 
| 15.13 (103)
| 
| 6.15 (51)
| Glenferrie Oval
| 11,000
| 11 July 1964
|- bgcolor="#FFFFFF"
| 
| 7.12 (54)
| 
| 10.15 (75)
| Kardinia Park
| 33,761
| 11 July 1964
|- bgcolor="#FFFFFF"
| 
| 12.11 (83)
| 
| 9.7 (61)
| Punt Road Oval
| 12,000
| 11 July 1964
|- bgcolor="#FFFFFF"
| 
| 5.13 (43)
| 
| 11.10 (76)
| Junction Oval
| 30,100
| 11 July 1964
|- bgcolor="#FFFFFF"
| 
| 5.8 (38)
| 
| 13.10 (88)
| Brunswick Street Oval
| 17,093
| 11 July 1964
|- bgcolor="#FFFFFF"
| 
| 6.12 (48)
| 
| 7.5 (47)
| Arden Street Oval
| 16,020
| 11 July 1964

Round 13

|- bgcolor="#CCCCFF"
| Home team
| Home team score
| Away team
| Away team score
| Venue
| Crowd
| Date
|- bgcolor="#FFFFFF"
| 
| 18.15 (123)
| 
| 6.15 (51)
| MCG
| 29,631
| 18 July 1964
|- bgcolor="#FFFFFF"
| 
| 11.9 (75)
| 
| 10.10 (70)
| Western Oval
| 12,935
| 18 July 1964
|- bgcolor="#FFFFFF"
| 
| 13.28 (106)
| 
| 6.8 (44)
| Windy Hill
| 16,100
| 18 July 1964
|- bgcolor="#FFFFFF"
| 
| 8.11 (59)
| 
| 7.7 (49)
| Victoria Park
| 38,218
| 18 July 1964
|- bgcolor="#FFFFFF"
| 
| 5.12 (42)
| 
| 8.10 (58)
| Princes Park
| 18,423
| 18 July 1964
|- bgcolor="#FFFFFF"
| 
| 17.15 (117)
| 
| 5.14 (44)
| Lake Oval
| 10,350
| 18 July 1964

Round 14

|- bgcolor="#CCCCFF"
| Home team
| Home team score
| Away team
| Away team score
| Venue
| Crowd
| Date
|- bgcolor="#FFFFFF"
| 
| 13.21 (99)
| 
| 5.4 (34)
| Punt Road Oval
| 12,500
| 25 July 1964
|- bgcolor="#FFFFFF"
| 
| 14.15 (99)
| 
| 5.5 (35)
| Victoria Park
| 22,233
| 25 July 1964
|- bgcolor="#FFFFFF"
| 
| 9.14 (68)
| 
| 12.8 (80)
| Princes Park
| 17,831
| 25 July 1964
|- bgcolor="#FFFFFF"
| 
| 11.15 (81)
| 
| 7.9 (51)
| Junction Oval
| 18,600
| 25 July 1964
|- bgcolor="#FFFFFF"
| 
| 10.22 (82)
| 
| 4.3 (27)
| Kardinia Park
| 13,854
| 25 July 1964
|- bgcolor="#FFFFFF"
| 
| 7.14 (56)
| 
| 12.13 (85)
| Arden Street Oval
| 15,878
| 25 July 1964

Round 15

|- bgcolor="#CCCCFF"
| Home team
| Home team score
| Away team
| Away team score
| Venue
| Crowd
| Date
|- bgcolor="#FFFFFF"
| 
| 8.7 (55)
| 
| 5.7 (37)
| MCG
| 33,212
| 1 August 1964
|- bgcolor="#FFFFFF"
| 
| 7.7 (49)
| 
| 5.8 (38)
| Glenferrie Oval
| 9,100
| 1 August 1964
|- bgcolor="#FFFFFF"
| 
| 2.9 (21)
| 
| 10.16 (76)
| Brunswick Street Oval
| 7,167
| 1 August 1964
|- bgcolor="#FFFFFF"
| 
| 5.13 (43)
| 
| 6.7 (43)
| Windy Hill
| 27,000
| 1 August 1964
|- bgcolor="#FFFFFF"
| 
| 5.13 (43)
| 
| 12.13 (85)
| Lake Oval
| 12,600
| 1 August 1964
|- bgcolor="#FFFFFF"
| 
| 11.6 (72)
| 
| 10.7 (67)
| Western Oval
| 11,038
| 1 August 1964

Round 16

|- bgcolor="#CCCCFF"
| Home team
| Home team score
| Away team
| Away team score
| Venue
| Crowd
| Date
|- bgcolor="#FFFFFF"
| 
| 8.9 (57)
| 
| 1.9 (15)
| Kardinia Park
| 16,436
| 8 August 1964
|- bgcolor="#FFFFFF"
| 
| 10.8 (68)
| 
| 4.3 (27)
| Western Oval
| 13,366
| 8 August 1964
|- bgcolor="#FFFFFF"
| 
| 9.10 (64)
| 
| 10.13 (73)
| Brunswick Street Oval
| 7,322
| 8 August 1964
|- bgcolor="#FFFFFF"
| 
| 11.13 (79)
| 
| 12.7 (79)
| Princes Park
| 25,875
| 8 August 1964
|- bgcolor="#FFFFFF"
| 
| 10.12 (72)
| 
| 6.11 (47)
| Junction Oval
| 16,700
| 8 August 1964
|- bgcolor="#FFFFFF"
| 
| 7.6 (48)
| 
| 6.14 (50)
| MCG
| 70,385
| 8 August 1964

Round 17

|- bgcolor="#CCCCFF"
| Home team
| Home team score
| Away team
| Away team score
| Venue
| Crowd
| Date
|- bgcolor="#FFFFFF"
| 
| 10.9 (69)
| 
| 10.13 (73)
| Glenferrie Oval
| 20,000
| 15 August 1964
|- bgcolor="#FFFFFF"
| 
| 9.14 (68)
| 
| 9.11 (65)
| Victoria Park
| 45,907
| 15 August 1964
|- bgcolor="#FFFFFF"
| 
| 6.9 (45)
| 
| 8.13 (61)
| Princes Park
| 17,178
| 15 August 1964
|- bgcolor="#FFFFFF"
| 
| 7.14 (56)
| 
| 12.10 (82)
| Punt Road Oval
| 18,000
| 15 August 1964
|- bgcolor="#FFFFFF"
| 
| 10.8 (68)
| 
| 10.15 (75)
| Lake Oval
| 11,060
| 15 August 1964
|- bgcolor="#FFFFFF"
| 
| 11.14 (80)
| 
| 12.7 (79)
| Arden Street Oval
| 17,178
| 15 August 1964

Round 18

|- bgcolor="#CCCCFF"
| Home team
| Home team score
| Away team
| Away team score
| Venue
| Crowd
| Date
|- bgcolor="#FFFFFF"
| 
| 12.6 (78)
| 
| 4.14 (38)
| Western Oval
| 20,555
| 22 August 1964
|- bgcolor="#FFFFFF"
| 
| 28.16 (184)
| 
| 2.7 (19)
| Windy Hill
| 16,800
| 22 August 1964
|- bgcolor="#FFFFFF"
| 
| 9.18 (72)
| 
| 16.19 (115)
| Punt Road Oval
| 15,500
| 22 August 1964
|- bgcolor="#FFFFFF"
| 
| 12.18 (90)
| 
| 11.12 (78)
| Junction Oval
| 27,100
| 22 August 1964
|- bgcolor="#FFFFFF"
| 
| 8.13 (61)
| 
| 14.8 (92)
| Arden Street Oval
| 21,895
| 22 August 1964
|- bgcolor="#FFFFFF"
| 
| 7.12 (54)
| 
| 19.20 (134)
| Brunswick Street Oval
| 14,151
| 22 August 1964

Ladder

Consolation Night Series Competition
The night series were held under the floodlights at Lake Oval, South Melbourne, for the teams (5th to 12th on ladder) out of the finals at the end of the season.

Final: Footscray 11.12 (78) defeated St Kilda 11.7 (73).

Premiership Finals

First Semi-Final

Second Semi-Final

Preliminary Final

Grand final

Awards
 The 1964 VFL Premiership team was Melbourne.
 The VFL's leading goalkicker was John Peck of Hawthorn who kicked 68 goals.
 The winner of the 1964 Brownlow Medal was awarded to Gordon Collis of Carlton with 28 votes (he was reported in Round 6, but was cleared).
 Fitzroy took the "wooden spoon" in 1964; as of 2022, they are the most recent team to endure a winless season.
Geelong 9.13 (67) defeated  6.8 (44) in the Grand Final, held as a curtain-raiser to the seniors Grand Final at the Melbourne Cricket Ground on 19 September.

Notable events
Shortly before the start of the season,  came to an arrangement with the City of Moorabbin that it would move its playing and administrative base from the Junction Oval to the Moorabbin Oval from the 1965 season, becoming the first club to voluntarily move from its traditional home ground. St Kilda was motivated by the desire to manage and operate its own venue, including a licensed social club, rather than remain in its current situation where the St Kilda Cricket Club managed the operations of the ground. A group of members sought an injunction to prevent the move, and in May the Supreme Court allowed the move provided there was a vote among the club's members, which ultimately saw a 75% majority in favour of the move. The move had ramifications in the Victorian Football Association, where the local Moorabbin Football Club was expelled from the competition for supporting the Saints and the council in their moves.
 Carlton's Gordon Collis was reported in Round 6, but the charge was not upheld and he went on to win the Brownlow Medal.
 At the end of the Round 10 match between Geelong and North Melbourne at Kardinia Park, North Melbourne coach, 5'4" (163 cm) Alan Killigrew was king-hit in the players race by an officially unidentified Geelong player. A brief brawl ensued, with Killigrew emerging with his face covered in blood. The VFL initiates an inquiry into the matter, involving the examination of 20 different witnesses. On 20 July the VFL announces that no charges will be laid against Geelong's 6'2" (188 cm) Geoff Rosenow.
 In Round 13, North Melbourne rover and professional dentist Allen Aylett broke his left arm, and retired immediately.
 On 22 August 1964 (Round 18), St Kilda played its farewell home game at the Junction Oval. On the same day, Richmond played its last home game, and the last VFL match, at the Punt Road Oval, as the club began playing its home games at the Melbourne Cricket Ground from 1965; it was not known at the time that this was a farewell match for the venue, as the deal to change grounds was not made until after the season.

See also
 1964 VFL Grand Final

References

Bibliography
 Maplestone, M., Flying Higher: History of the Essendon Football Club 1872–1996, Essendon Football Club, (Melbourne), 1996. 
 Rogers, S. & Brown, A., Every Game Ever Played: VFL/AFL Results 1897–1997 (Sixth Edition), Viking Books, (Ringwood), 1998. 
 Ross, J. (ed), 100 Years of Australian Football 1897–1996: The Complete Story of the AFL, All the Big Stories, All the Great Pictures, All the Champions, Every AFL Season Reported, Viking, (Ringwood), 1996.

External links
 1964 Season – AFL Tables

Australian Football League seasons
VFL season